Fabio Fabbri (born 15 October 1933) is an Italian former politician and lawyer.

Biography
Fabbri was born in Ciano d 'Enza, Italy, on 15 October 1933. He graduated from the University of Parma with a law degree, and began a career as a lawyer.

Fabbri was a Senator from 1976 to 1994 for the Italian Socialist Party. He was an Undersecretary for Agriculture and Forestry in the 2nd Cossiga government, in the Forlani government and the two Spadolini governments, and the Secretary of the Council of Ministers in the first Amato government. He also served as minister for regional affairs in the fifth Fanfani government, as minister of community policies in the second Craxi government and as minister of defence in the Ciampi government.

Since leaving office he has worked on protecting the Apennine Mountains through an editorial initiative and the Man and the Biosphere Programme.

Honours and awards
 Italy: Chancellor and Treasurer of the Military Order of Italy (From 28 April 1993 to 10 May 1994)
 Italy: Knight of the Grand Cross of the Order of Merit of the Italian Republic (Rome, 11 May 1994)

References

External links

1933 births
Living people
People from the Province of Reggio Emilia
Italian Socialist Party politicians
Government ministers of Italy
Italian Ministers of Defence
Senators of Legislature VII of Italy
Senators of Legislature VIII of Italy
Senators of Legislature IX of Italy
Senators of Legislature X of Italy
Senators of Legislature XI of Italy
Politicians of Emilia-Romagna
University of Parma alumni
20th-century Italian jurists